Anton ("Ton") Willem van Klooster (born 17 February 1954) is a former freestyle swimmer from the Netherlands. He competed at the 1972 Summer Olympics and was eliminated in the heats of the 400 m and 1500 m freestyle events. Twenty years later he was the head coach of the Dutch Olympic Swim Team at the 1992 Summer Olympics in Barcelona, Spain.

References

1954 births
Living people
Dutch male freestyle swimmers
Olympic swimmers of the Netherlands
Swimmers at the 1972 Summer Olympics
Dutch swimming coaches
Universiade medalists in swimming
Sportspeople from Hilversum
Universiade silver medalists for the Netherlands
Medalists at the 1973 Summer Universiade
20th-century Dutch people